Hispolon is a bio-active isolate of Phellinus linteus.

References

Catechols